The 2004–05 Scottish Second Division was won by Brechin City who, along with second placed Stranraer, gained promotion to the First Division. Arbroath and Berwick Rangers, meanwhile, were relegated to the Third Division.

Table

Top scorers

Attendances

The average attendances for Division Two clubs for season 2004–05 are shown below:

Scottish Second Division seasons
2
3
Scot